The 2011 FIS Ski Jumping Grand Prix was the 18th Summer Grand Prix season in ski jumping on plastic. Season began on 17 July 2011 in Wisła, Poland and ended on 3 October 2011 in Klingenthal, Germany.

Other competitive circuits this season included the World Cup and Continental Cup.

Calendar

Men

Men's team

Standings

Overall

Nations Cup

Poland Tour

References

Grand Prix
FIS Grand Prix Ski Jumping